The 2005 Volvo Women's Open was a women's tennis tournament played on outdoor hard courts in Pattaya, Thailand. It was part of Tier IV of the 2005 WTA Tour. It was the 14th edition of the tournament and was held from 31 January through 6 February 2005. Third-seeded Conchita Martínez won the singles title and earned $25,650 first-prize money.

Finals

Singles
 Conchita Martínez defeated  Anna-Lena Grönefeld, 6–3, 3–6, 6–3
 This was Martínez' 1st singles title of the year and the 33rd and last of her career.

Doubles
 Marion Bartoli /  Anna-Lena Grönefeld defeated  Marta Domachowska /  Silvija Talaja, 6–3, 6–2

References

External links
 ITF tournament edition details 
 Tournament draws

 
 WTA Tour
 in women's tennis
Tennis, WTA Tour, Volvo Women's Open
Tennis, WTA Tour, Volvo Women's Open

Tennis, WTA Tour, Volvo Women's Open
Tennis, WTA Tour, Volvo Women's Open